The Queen's Staircase is a walkway of 66 steps ( in Nassau, the capital city of The Bahamas. It was carved out of solid limestone rock by 600 slaves between 1793 and 1794 to create an escape route from the fort above and is a major landmark of Nassau. The stairs are located at Fort Fincastle Historic Complex near Bennet's Hill in Downtown Nassau next to Princess Margaret Hospital and Grosvenor Campus of the University of the Bahamas.

The staircase has water cascading to a pool below, along the side over series of steps. At the bottom a walkway goes between high stone walls, tropical plants and trees.

History

In the 19th century the steps were later named in honor of Queen Victoria, Queen of the United Kingdom of Great Britain and Ireland, who ended slavery in the British Empire. The number of steps is, by coincidence, equal to the number of years in Victoria's reign.

See also
 Spanish Steps
 Jacob's Ladder (Saint Helena)
 Potemkin Stairs

References

Buildings and structures in Nassau, Bahamas